Burkina Faso has sent athletes to every Summer Olympic Games held since 1988.  Under its previous name of Upper Volta (VOL), the country also competed in 1972. After appearing in eight different Olympics, Burkina Faso won their first Olympic medal at the 2020 Summer Olympics, following Hugues Fabrice Zango's bronze-winning performance in the men's triple jump. No athletes from Burkina Faso have competed in any Winter Olympic Games.

Medal tables

Medals by Summer Games

Medals by sport

List of medalists

See also
 List of flag bearers for Burkina Faso at the Olympics
 Burkina Faso at the Paralympics

References

External links